The Hornsby Water Clock, titled Man, Time and the Environment is a piece of kinetic sculpture, a decorative fountain and a functional clock in the Florence Street pedestrian mall in Hornsby, New South Wales, Australia. Unveiled in 1993, the sculpture was designed and engineered by Victor Cusack and constructed of bronze, stainless steel and glass by Victor and his foundry floor manager Rex Feakes. Construction, including alterations to the mall, cost over A$1 million and took two and half years; thereafter, chicken bones and other carelessly discarded items caused many breakdowns before the water filtration system was upgraded.

Overview
Thought by some to have actually been at Hornsby much longer than when it was unveiled in 1993, it is a combination of three water-powered clocks – a 4th-century BC Greek clepsydra, an 11th-century Chinese water wheel clock and a 17th-century Swiss pendulum clock – plus a 17-note bronze carillon to ring the hour based on a 250-year-old design found in an old English church. The whole assembly is mounted on a floating pontoon that rotates every 12 hours giving a fourth time indicator as a pointer sweeps past Roman numerals placed in the water around the fountain's perimeter.

Philosophy
The clock is adorned with four plaques, three of which explain the operation of the three individual clocks in the overall structure, and one explaining the clock's purpose overall.

This first plaque says, "This mobile water sculpture is a unique environmental statement, particular relevant to Hornsby, an area retaining extensive unspoilt natural areas with abundant land and marine based flora and fauna. Its symbolism is contrasting man's historically joyful creativity with his rapidly increasing inability to co-exist with virtually all forms of life on earth."

It goes on to suggest there is a "polarity" between the "joyful complexity of creation" shown in the mechanisms mankind has invented such as those on display and the destruction we are causing by the rapidly rising global population. It pays "tribute" to the beauty of the environment in the area and our need to be responsible to our "fellow animals (human and otherwise)".

Animals represented in the sculpture are the:
Tawny frogmouth
Rainbow lorikeet
Pied cormorant
Little penguin
Australian pelican
Australian water dragon
Blue-tongued lizard
Goanna
Grey-headed flying fox
Brushtail possum
Sea eagle
Human

Individual clocks

Greek clepsydra clock

In this type of clock, water is run into a stationary vessel from a tank which is kept meniscus-full meaning that water rises over the top edge of the tank forming a convex meniscus and excess water is drained away. Since the depth of the water in the supply tank is constant, water is released at a constant rate; the depth of water in the receiving vessel is a measure of time.

In this example, two tubes on bearings are arranged so that they overbalance when full, thereby dumping their contents into the pond and returning to vertical under the influence of a counterweight at which point the cycle starts over. The counterweight is in the shape of a ram's head, while the top of each tube is decorated with the head of a Hermaphrodite.

Chinese water wheel clock

This clock uses 20 counterweighted buckets that are free to swing and are mounted around the edge of a wheel  in diameter. Water supplied from a meniscus-full tank runs into a bucket at a constant rate until the weight of water in the bucket is sufficient to overcome the counterweight (see the Chinese Buddha sculpture) allowing the bucket to tip over spilling its contents. As it falls, it trips a lever connected by a cable to a catch on top of the water wheel which is released to allow the wheel to rotate. However, by the time it has moved on, the catch has returned to its position locking the wheel in place so that the next empty bucket is now under the water flow to repeat the cycle.

The design is based on one by Su Song who built a clock as part of an observatory tower in the period 1088-1092.

Swiss pendulum clock

The design is based on one drawn up by Claude Perrault in 1669 but never built.

The  pendulum mounted on a knife-edge to minimize friction and is kept moving by the "top drive" (the top moving glass chutes); as one side becomes full, it tilts the mechanism over to its side so that the water is discharged and the other tank receives the water supply underneath the sea eagle sculpture.

Seconds are marked by the rotation of the glass wheel which has 30 pins around the edge. Each half-cycle of the pendulum (2 seconds) results in the wheel moving to the next pin so it completes a cycle every minute. A cam on the "second wheel" releases the holdback arm on the lower drive every 30 seconds, discharging  of water and moves the minute hand once a minute and the hour hand once every 12 minutes.

Instead of numbers, the hours on the clock face are marked by the letters that make up "Dare we forget". The clock is decorated with various animals to "remind us that we are losing species on our earth due to our sometimes insensitive land use" and aboriginal art forms "as a reminder that Hornsby once maintained a strong tribal population that suffered the same fate as many animals are suffering".

The pendulum clock is used to control the rotation of the pontoon, the chimes and to supply water to the Chinese clock.

Pontoon rotation clock

The complete sculpture is rotated by the water underneath it swirling in a clockwise direction when viewed from above. The rate at which it turns is regulated by a "catch" device on the pontoon edge that locks into one of the 60 stops secured to the wall of the inner pond. Every 12 minutes the catch is released by a mechanism linked the pendulum clock allowing the pontoon to rotate until the next stop is reached.

Carillon or chime set

The carillon has 17 tubes of cast bell-bronze that chime automatically on the hour, or they can be played manually. The mechanism is of a design invented by "Harringtons of Coventry" and seen by the sculptor at a church in Haywards Heath in Sussex though the frame has been constructed of metal rather than wood and this set has 17 tubes instead of the 6 to 9 seen elsewhere.

Plaques

See also
Nylex Clock
Royal Clock

References

External links

The Water Clock Chronicles on YouTube. Sculptor, Victor Cusack explains the history, workings and meanings of his Water Clock.
The Hornsby Water Clock Story on YouTube. This undated segment of a current affairs program was apparently made while initial problems were still being worked through. It appears to be from The 7:30 Report with Quentin Dempster presenting (he appears momentarily at 4:37) which would place it before 1995 when Kerry O'Brien took over.
The Carillon in Hornsby Mall on YouTube. Victor Cusack playing the instrument.

Clocks in Australia
Individual clocks
Water clocks
Fountains in Sydney
Tourist attractions in New South Wales
Buildings and structures in New South Wales
1993 sculptures
Kinetic sculptures
Birds in art
Lizards in art
Hornsby, New South Wales